Bláhový sen is a 1943 Czech film. The film starred Josef Kemr.

References

External links
 

1943 films
Czechoslovak musical drama films
1940s Czech-language films
Czech black-and-white films
Czech musical drama films
1940s musical drama films
1943 drama films
1940s Czech films